The 1946 Memorial Cup final was the 28th junior ice hockey championship of the Canadian Amateur Hockey Association. The George Richardson Memorial Trophy champions Toronto St. Michael's Majors of the Ontario Hockey Association in Eastern Canada competed against the Abbott Cup champions Winnipeg Monarchs of the Manitoba Junior Hockey League in Western Canada. In a best-of-seven series, held at Maple Leaf Gardens in Toronto, Ontario, Winnipeg won their 3rd Memorial Cup, defeating St. Michael's 4 games to 3.

Scores
Game 1: Winnipeg 3-2 St. Michael's
Game 2: St. Michael's 5-3 Winnipeg
Game 3: St. Michael's 7-3 Winnipeg
Game 4: Winnipeg 4-3 St. Michael's
Game 5: St. Michael's 7-4 Winnipeg
Game 6: Winnipeg 4-2 St. Michael's
Game 7: Winnipeg 4-2 St. Michael's

Winning roster
Clint Albright, Hy Beatty, Al Buchanan, Ted Chitty, Dunc Daniels, Gord Fashoway, Jack Gibson, Tank Kummerfield, Eddie Marchant, Laurie May, Red McRae, Cam Millar, George Robertson, Tom Rockey, Gord Scott, Harry Taylor, Bill Tindall.  Coach: Walter Monson

References

External links
 Memorial Cup
 Canadian Hockey League

1945–46 in Canadian ice hockey
Memorial Cup tournaments
Ice hockey competitions in Toronto
1940s in Toronto